Solomon Quetsch was an Austrian rabbi and Talmudist. He was born at Nikolsburg, Moravia on 13 October 1798 and died there on 30 January 1856. He was educated at the yeshiva of his native city under Mordechai Benet, and was his premier disciple. He officiated as rabbi successively at Piesling, Leipnik, and Nikolsburg. In the later city, where he succeeded Rabbi Samson Raphael Hirsch, he officiated for only a few months. He was a traditionalist, but was distinguished by a tolerant and kindly disposition. Of his literary works only some Talmudic novellæ are known, edited under the title Chokmat Shelomoh in the collection Har haMor by Moses Löb Kohn (Vienna, 1862).

References
 Its bibliography:
Friedländer, Dore ha-Dorot, p. 62, Brünn, 1876
Kaufmann Gedenkbuch, p. 338;
Die Deborah, 1902, p. 38;
Schnitzer, Jüdische Kulturbilder aus Meinem Leben, pp. 38–56, Vienna, 1904;
Van Straalen, Cat. Hebr. Books Brit. Mus. p. 21;
S. Klein, in preface to Liḳḳuṭe Shelomoh, Páks, 1893.

19th-century Czech rabbis
Czech Orthodox rabbis
Rabbis from Nikolsburg
1798 births
1856 deaths